Jean-Claude "J.C." D'Amours (born December 19, 1972) is a Canadian politician and who represents Edmundston-Madawaska Centre in the New Brunswick legislature. He is a former Member of Parliament for Madawaska—Restigouche.

Born in Edmundston, New Brunswick, D'Amours served as a city councillor in Edmundston from 1998 to 2004. D'Amours is a former account executive, development manager and a financial agent/adviser/consultant.

In the 2004 federal election, D'Amours was elected to the House of Commons of Canada as a member of the Liberal Party of Canada. During his first mandate, he was a member of the Standing Committee on Human Resources, Skills Development, Social Development and the Status of Persons with Disabilities, the Standing Committee on Official Languages and the Subcommittee on the Employment Insurance Funds of the Standing Committee on Human Resources, Skills Development, Social Development and the Status of Persons with Disabilities.

He was re-elected in the 2006 federal election after a close race with Conservative candidate Jean-Pierre Ouellet. His campaign focused on improving the Employment Insurance Program, transferring federal government jobs to rural regions, creating a community development fund and creating a national forum on the forest industry.

D'Amours was defeated by Conservative Bernard Valcourt in the 2011 federal election.

D'Amours was elected in the 2018 provincial election and re-elected in the 2020 provincial election.

Electoral history

Provincial

Federal

References

External links
Official website
How'd They Vote?: Voting history and quotes

1972 births
Acadian people
Liberal Party of Canada MPs
Living people
Members of the House of Commons of Canada from New Brunswick
People from Edmundston
New Brunswick Liberal Association MLAs
New Brunswick municipal councillors
21st-century Canadian politicians